Golden Tears was Bonnie Pink's eighth studio album released under the Warner Music Japan label on September 21, 2005.

Track listing

Charts

Album

Single

Notes 

2005 albums
Bonnie Pink albums
Albums produced by Tore Johansson
Warner Music Japan albums